The Bernardo Fire was a wildfire that occurred during the May 2014 San Diego County wildfire outbreak. The Bernardo fire was the second of the May 2014 wildfires in San Diego County, and the first of the swarm of wildfires that ignited in mid-May, following dry weather and Santa Ana conditions. The fire ignited in 4S Ranch in San Diego County, on May 13, near Del Norte High School, and eventually spread southward and westward, burning  of land. The Bernardo Fire was extinguished on May 17, without causing any significant property losses.

Fire
The fire started on Tuesday, May 13, at 10:00 AM PDT, just south of Del Norte High School, in a construction trench off Nighthawk Lane. Over the next few hours, the wildfire intensified, due to the strong Santa Ana winds driving it southward. This prompted the evacuation of several schools (with the exception of Del Norte High School), in addition to at least 20,000 homes. Within several hours, the fire covered at least  and was only 5% contained. The rapid southward spread of the fire caused mandatory evacuation orders to be issued for portions of 4S Ranch, Del Sur, Black Mountain Ranch, Rancho Santa Fe, and other residential communities. By 12:00 AM PDT on May 14, the portion of the fire within 4S Ranch and Del Sur had been completely extinguished, which was about 25% of the Bernardo Fire's 1,600 acre blaze. Later on May 14, all of the evacuation orders were lifted.

On Wednesday, May 14, at 6 PM PDT, the wildfire was 50% contained. By the next morning, it was reported as 75% contained and no longer expanding. On May 16, the Bernardo Fire was reported to be 90% contained, but some structures were still threatened by the fire. On May 17, the fire was 95% contained, without having expanded any further. On May 17, at 8:14 PM PDT, the Bernardo Fire was reported to be 100% contained.

The San Diego Unified School District closed all its schools citywide on May 15, but reopened most of them on the following day.

The cause of the Bernardo Fire has been ruled to be accidental; authorities said that it started in a small trench being dug by a construction crew and spread rapidly through the dry brush at the site. The Bernardo Fire had been ignited by sparks coming from a backhoe trencher.

See also
Cedar Fire (2003)
2005 Labor Day brush fire
October 2007 California wildfires
Witch Fire
Cocos Fire
2016 California wildfires
December 2017 Southern California wildfires

References

External links
Largest fires in San Diego County history - ABC 10News

2014 California wildfires
Wildfires in San Diego County, California
May 2014 events in the United States